Laurence Allerthorp or Allerthorpe (d. 21 July 1406)
Canon of London and Dean of Wolverhampton, was Lord High Treasurer of England  from 31 May 1401 until  27 February 1402.

Notes

15th-century English people
1406 deaths
Lord High Treasurers of England